Piet Piraat is a Flemish children's program written and produced by Studio 100. Shown in Belgium on Ketnet and in the Netherlands on Z@PP, Piet Piraat is a good-natured pirate who crosses the Seven Seas with his crew, getting into various adventures. The five-minute stories bear resemblance to  Studio 100's main production, Samson en Gert, and mostly deal with the same subject matter; "cheaters never win" and "honesty is the best policy".

Characters

The series features four characters.

Piet Piraat "Peter Pirate" (Peter Van De Velde): 
The captain of the Scheve Schuit (The Crooked Barge in English, although it is anything but crummy). He appears to be far more intelligent than the others and is always there to resolve any problems or fights.

Stien Struis "Steen Strong" (Anke Helsen): 
Strong, but a little dim, Stien tries to solve everything by using her strength, managing only to break stuff in the process.

Berend Brokkenpap "Brian Porridgechucks" (Dirk Bosschaert): 
The ship's chef, and a decidedly sneaky character. Berend is constantly causing problems, staging pranks and generally annoying the rest of the crew, but he always gets his comeuppance, only to fall back into his old behaviour after apologizing.

Steven Stil "Silent Steven" (Dirk van Vooren): 
His name translates to 'Silent Steve' since he is unable to talk. Although Steven is Berend's sidekick, he often finds himself on the receiving end of whatever it is that goes wrong.

Comics adaptations
Between 2002 and 2012, Piet Piraat was adapted into a comics series by Wim Swerts and Luc Van Asten.

Film adaptations
Like other Studio 100 characters Piet Piraat was given a feature-length movie; Het zwaard van Kapitein Zilvertand (Captain Silvertooth's Sword) was premiered in 2008 and featured Dutch actor Peter Faber as the Captain Teague-style nemesis.
Many other movies followed.

Spin-off
There's currently a spin-off of the series called "Piet Piraat Wonderwaterwereld" ("Piet Pirate Wonderwaterworld").
In this series Piet teaches the little viewers things about the ocean. The other cast members are not seen in this show.

References

External links 
 Belgium (Dutch)
 The Netherlands  (Dutch)

2001 Belgian television series debuts
2000s Belgian television series
2010s Belgian television series
2020s Belgian television series
Flemish television shows
Belgian children's television shows
Television series about pirates
Piraat, Piet
Piraat, Piet
Piraat, Piet
Television shows adapted into comics
Television shows adapted into films
Ketnet original programming
NPO 3 original programming